Camilo Leonardo Ponce Rojas (born 18 February 1991) is a Chilean footballer who plays for Deportes Copiapó.

References

1991 births
Living people
Chilean footballers
Chilean Primera División players
Everton de Viña del Mar footballers
Association football forwards
Lota Schwager footballers
Trasandino footballers
Curicó Unido footballers
Ñublense footballers